Disa borbonica is a species of orchid in the Orchidaceae family. It is endemic to Réunion.

References

External links

 
 

borbonica
Orchids of Réunion
Endemic flora of Réunion
Plants described in 1876
Taxa named by Isaac Bayley Balfour
Taxa named by Spencer Le Marchant Moore